Loch Tarbert is a sea loch on the west coast of Jura, an island in Scotland.

As the name Tarbert suggests, it comes close to cutting the island in half.

References

Sea lochs of Scotland
Lochs of Argyll and Bute
Loch